James Robert Mason (born 19 June 1947) is an Australian field hockey player from Townsville, who won the silver medal with the Men's National Team at the 1968 Summer Olympics in Mexico City.

References
 Profile

External links
 

1947 births
Living people
Australian male field hockey players
Olympic field hockey players of Australia
Field hockey players at the 1968 Summer Olympics
Field hockey players at the 1972 Summer Olympics
Olympic silver medalists for Australia
Place of birth missing (living people)
Olympic medalists in field hockey
Medalists at the 1968 Summer Olympics